The Order of Nova Scotia is a civilian honour for merit in the Canadian province of Nova Scotia. Instituted on August 2, 2001, when Lieutenant Governor Myra Freeman granted Royal Assent to the Order of Nova Scotia Act, the order is administered by the Governor-in-Council and is intended to honour current or former Nova Scotia residents for conspicuous achievements in any field, being thus described as the highest honour amongst all others conferred by the Nova Scotia Crown.

Structure and appointment
The Order of Nova Scotia is intended to honour any current or former longtime resident of Nova Scotia who has demonstrated a high level of individual excellence and achievement in any field, having "distinguished themselves in many fields of endeavour and hav[ing] brought honour and prestige to themselves and to Nova Scotia." There are no limits on how many can belong to the order, though inductions are limited to five per year; Canadian citizenship is a requirement, and those who are elected or appointed members of a governmental body are ineligible as long as they hold office.

The process of finding qualified individuals begins with submissions from the public to the Order of Nova Scotia Advisory Council, which consists of a person who serves as the chair, appointed by the premier; the Chief Justice of Nova Scotia; the Clerk of the Executive Council and an individual appointed by the clerk; the president of a university in the province; and one person appointed by each of the leaders of the parties in the House of Assembly, all of whom must be resident in Nova Scotia. This committee then meets at least once annually to make its selected recommendations to the Executive Council and works with that body in narrowing down the potential appointees to a list that will be submitted to the lieutenant governor; posthumous nominations are accepted up to one year following the nominee's death. The lieutenant governor, ex officio a Member and the Chancellor of the Order of Nova Scotia, then makes all appointments into the fellowship's single grade of membership by an Order in Council that bears the viceroyal sign-manual and the Great Seal of the province; thereafter, the new Members are entitled to use the post-nominal letters ONS.

Insignia
Upon admission into the Order of Nova Scotia, usually in a ceremony held at Government House in Halifax, new Members are presented with the order's insignia. The main badge consists of a gold medallion in the form of a stylized epigaea repens (or mayflower)—the official provincial flower—with the obverse in white enamel with gold edging, and bearing at its centre the escutcheon of the arms of Nova Scotia, all surmounted by a St. Edward's Crown symbolizing the Canadian monarch's role as the fount of honour. The ribbon is patterned with vertical stripes in red, blue, gold, and white; men wear the medallion suspended from this ribbon at the collar, while women carry theirs on a ribbon bow at the left chest. Members also receive a lapel pin that can be worn during less formal occasions.

Inductees
The following are some notable appointees of the Order of Nova Scotia:
 Myra Freeman , Lieutenant Governor of Nova Scotia, appointed 2001
 Anne Murray , singer, appointed 2002
Daniel N. Paul, Mi'kmaw Saqmawiey (Eldering) C.M., O.N.S., LLD, DLIT, Author, Historian, appointed 2002
 Carrie M. Best , journalist, appointed 2002
 Lorne O. Clarke , Chief Justice of Nova Scotia, appointed 2002
 David Alexander Colville , painter, appointed 2003
 John Patrick Savage , Premier of Nova Scotia, appointed 2002
 Hugh Allan MacMaster , musician, appointed 2003
 Sister Dorothy Moore, CC, Mi'kmaw educator, appointed 2003
 Rita MacNeil , singer and songwriter, appointed 2005
 Constance R. Glube , Chief Justice of Nova Scotia, appointed 2005
 Mayann E. Francis , Lieutenant Governor of Nova Scotia, appointed 2006
 Flora Isabel MacDonald , politician, appointed 2007
 Joyce Carman Barkhouse , children's author, appointed 2007
Nora Bernard, Mi'kmaq activist, appointed posthumously 2008
 Ruth Goldbloom , former director of Pier 21 National Immigration Museum, appointed 2008
 Sidney Patrick Crosby , professional hockey player currently playing for the NHL's Pittsburgh Penguins, appointed 2008
 J. Chalmers Doane , Canadian educator and musician, appointed 2010
 Wanda Thomas Bernard OC ONS, social worker, educator, Canadian Senator, appointed 2014
Janet Kitz, educator, Halifax Explosion historian and author, appointed 2018
Noni MacDonald , paediatrician and first woman Dean of the Dalhousie University Faculty of Medicine, appointed 2019
Stella Bowles , environmental scientist and youngest recipient of the Order of Nova Scotia, appointed 2020

See also
 Canadian order of precedence (decorations and medals)
 Symbols of Nova Scotia
 State decoration

External links
 Order of Nova Scotia webpage

References

Provincial and territorial orders of Canada
Nova Scotia awards